Kim Tae-ho (born May 4, 1975) is a South Korean television director.

Biography 
Kim graduated from Korea University. In July 2009 he married his wife, a make-up artist. Their son was born in December 2014.

Career 
Kim joined the Munhwa Broadcasting Corporation (MBC) in 2002 and worked largely on the channel's Sunday night programs aired on Sunday Sunday Night. He gained prominence amongst viewers as the director of Infinite Challenge due to his use of humorous subtitles and captions. His work on Infinite Challenge has garnered him popular and professional recognition and earned him nominations for various awards.

From September to November 2017 Kim was one of several thousand employees of MBC and KBS who participated in a joint labor union strike over unfair company practices at their respective broadcasting stations. He was reported to have won an award at the annual KCC Broadcasting Awards that August but refused to attend out of solidarity for his colleagues. As a result of the strike, popular programs on both MBC and KBS such as Infinite Challenge, Happy Together, Music Bank, Show! Music Core and others were canceled for up to twelve weeks. 

On September 7 2021, MBC announced that Kim would be leaving the company by the end of that year.

Filmography 
   Infinite Challenge
 Comedy House (Assistant Director)
 Nonstop 4 (Assistant Director)
 Saturday - Rash Challenge (Assistant Director)
 Sunday Sunday Night - Imagine Expedition
 Sunday Sunday Night - Live Cooking Show! Mr. King of Cook
 Sunday Sunday Night - Food Sports Mr. King of Cook
 Super Recommended Saturday - Excessive Challenge
 Super Recommended Saturday - Muhan Dojeon - Master of Quiz
 The Hungry and the Hairy (2020, Netflix)
 Funding Together (같이 펀딩) (August 2019~November 2019)
Hangout With Yoo (July 2019 - December 2021)
 Seoul Check-in (2022, TVING)

Awards

State honors

Notes

References

External links 
  
 Kim Tae-ho on Cyworld 
 Brief introduction page of the producing team of Muhan Dojeon 
 Infinite Challenge to His Life (Article from The Granite Tower, June 5, 2007)

Infinite Challenge
South Korean television directors
Korea University alumni
People from South Chungcheong Province
1975 births
Living people
Gwangsan Kim clan